Grimoard is a surname. Notable people with the surname include:

Angelic de Grimoard (born 1315), French Cardinal, younger brother of Pope Urban V
Anne Claude Philippe de Tubieres de Grimoard de Pestels de Levis, Comte de Caylus (1692–1765), French antiquarian
Claude Abraham de Tubières de Grimoard de Pestel de Lévis, duc de Caylus (1672–1759), French military leader
Philippe Henri, Comte de Grimoard (1753–1815), French soldier and military writer
Pope Urban V (1310–1370), whose name was Guillaume Grimoard

See also
Grimoald (disambiguation), a given name